Larry Watson is an American author of novels, poetry and short stories.

Early life
He was born in 1947 in Rugby, North Dakota. He grew up in Bismarck, North Dakota.  He graduated from Bismarck State College, then earned both bachelor's and master's degrees at the University of North Dakota. He subsequently earned a Doctorate in creative writing from the University of Utah.

Career
His short story "Where I Go, What I Do" was included in the anthology The Best American Short Stories in 1978. His first novel, In a Dark Time, was published in 1980. The book did not sell well, delaying Watson's plans for a second novel. But Montana 1948, published in 1993, was a success, winning the Milkweed National Fiction Prize that year and going on to sell more than half a million copies. The Washington Post called Montana 1948 "a significant and elegant addition to the fiction of the American West, and to contemporary American fiction in general." The book follows the story of a Montana family and involves the sexual assault and murder of a Native American woman. The book has been taught frequently in high schools, but its subject matter has been the subject of controversy. In 2020, Henry Sibley High School in Mendota Heights, Minnesota, announced that it would stop teaching the novel temporarily until fuller cultural context of the book's setting could be taught as well.

His subsequent novels include Orchard, Laura, Justice, and White Crosses. Esquire magazine called his 2011 novel American Boy one of the best books of that year.

Watson's 2013 novel 'Let Him Go', has been made into a film, directed by Thomas Bezucha, and starring Kevin Costner, Diane Lane and Lesley Manville. Filmed in Calgary in 2019, it was released by Focus Features in November 2020.

Watson taught writing and literature at the University of Wisconsin - Stevens Point for 25 years before joining the faculty at Marquette University in 2003 as a visiting professor.

Bibliography

Novels

, collected fiction

Poetry

Watson, Larry (2019). Late Assignments.  Standing Stone Books.

Honors
 Fellowships from the National Endowment for the Arts (1987, 2004)
 Grants from the Wisconsin Arts Board
 Milkweed National Fiction Prize (1993) for Montana 1948
 Friends of American Writers Award
 Mountains and Plains Independent Booksellers Association Fiction Award (1994) 
 New York Public Library Fiction Award
 Wisconsin Library Association Award
 Critics’ Choice Award
 The High Plains Book Award

References

External links

 

1947 births
Living people
People from Rugby, North Dakota
20th-century American novelists
21st-century American novelists
American male novelists
Writers from North Dakota
Novelists from Wisconsin
Bismarck State College alumni
University of North Dakota alumni
University of Utah alumni
University of Wisconsin–Stevens Point faculty
20th-century American poets
21st-century American poets
American male poets
American male short story writers
20th-century American short story writers
21st-century American short story writers
20th-century American male writers
21st-century American male writers